I'm Telling the Truth but I'm Lying is a memoir by Nigerian spoken word artist Bassey Ikpi published by Harper Perennial an imprint of HarperCollins in 2019.

Plot 
The book is described as "a deep personal work that chronicles the Nigerian-American author's life living with bipolar II disorder and anxiety, and a woman of color and combating the stigma surrounding it." The essays cover her difficulties as a young child re-locating from Nigeria to America, struggling with household tensions, depression and hospitalization, leading up to her eventual diagnosis of and treatment for bipolar II disorder.

Development
On May 4, 2017, it was announced that her first book, a memoir titled Making Friends With Giants would be published by Harper Perennial in 2018.  The book, eventually renamed I'm Telling the Truth But I'm Lying was published in August 2019.

Reception 
The book became a New York Times bestseller. Essence described it as a "stunning essay collection". Kola Tubosun calls it "a kind of map for those interested in learning about how mental illness affects people."

References 

Memoirs
Nigerian non-fiction books
2019 non-fiction books
HarperCollins books